Jeli Thuluth is a calligraphic variety of Arabic script. This term was applied to writings in Thuluth script when the point of the pen employed was at least one centimeter broad. Jeli Thuluth was used in large panels and for inscriptions carved in stone on buildings or tombstones.

External links
 Hatvesanat.com (mainly )
 Calligraphy Gallery Jeli thuluth and other fonts

Arabic calligraphy